Thaxted may refer to:

 Thaxted, a town in the Uttlesford district, Essex, England
 Thaxted railway station, a station serving the village of Thaxted, Essex
 "Thaxted" (tune), a hymn tune by Gustav Holst, a resident of Thaxted